Bosnian Americans are Americans whose ancestry can be traced to Bosnia and Herzegovina. The vast majority of Bosnian Americans immigrated to the United States during and after the Bosnian War which lasted from 1992–95. Nevertheless, many Bosnians immigrated to the United States as early as the 19th century. The largest Bosnian American population can be found in Chicago, Illinois which boasts the largest number of Bosnians in the world outside Europe.

While official census reports from the 2010 Census indicate that there are 125,793 Bosnian-Americans in U.S., it is estimated that as of 2020 there are some 350,000 Americans of full or partial Bosnian descent living in the country.

Demography 
According to estimates from the American Community Survey for 2015 - 2019, there were 103,900 immigrants from Bosnia Herzegovina. The top counties of residence were:

1) Cook County, Illinois - 7,100

2) Saint Louis County, Missouri - 6,400

3) Polk County, Iowa - 4,000

4) Maricopa County, Arizona - 3,200

5) Duval County, Florida - 2,800

6) Oneida County, New York - 2,500

7) Macomb County, Michigan - 2,400

8) Pinellas County, Florida - 2,300

9) Kent County, Michigan - 2,100

10) Gwinnett County, Georgia - 2,100

11) Hartford County, Connecticut - 2,000

12) Black Hawk County, Iowa - 1,700

13) Santa Clara County, California - 1,600

14) Warren County, Kentucky - 1,500

15) Jefferson County,  Kentucky - 1,500

History

Early period
The first Bosnians settled in Chicago in the late 19th and early 20th centuries, joining other immigrants seeking better opportunities and better lives. As the former Yugoslavia continued to find its identity as a nation over the last century, the people of Bosnia and Herzegovina sought stability and new beginnings in the city of Chicago many intending to return to their homeland.  Those of these early Bosnian immigrants who were of Muslim faith were early leaders in the establishment of Chicago's Muslim community. In 1906, they established Dzemijetul Hajrije (The Benevolent Society) of Illinois to preserve the community's religious and national traditions as well as to provide mutual assistance for funerals and illness. The organization established chapters in Gary, Indiana, in 1913, and Butte, Montana, in 1916, and is the oldest existing Muslim organization in the United States.

Post World War II
Chicago's Bosnian community received a new influx of migrants after World War II who were displaced by the war and Communist takeover. This new wave of refugees included many well-educated professionals, some of whom were forced to take lower-skilled jobs as taxi cab drivers, factory workers, chauffeurs, and janitors. As the population increased in the early 1950s, the Muslim community invited Shaykh Kamil Avdich (Ćamil Avdić), a prominent Muslim scholar, to become the first permanent imam (religious minister). Under Imam Kamil's leadership, the Bosnian Muslim Religious and Cultural Home was established to raise funds for a mosque, which opened on Halsted Street in 1957. In 1968, the organization's name was changed to the Bosnian American Cultural Association, and in the early 1970s it purchased land in Northbrook to build a larger mosque and cultural center. The Islamic Cultural Center of Greater Chicago has remained an important center for Bosnian Muslim religious activity, serving Bosnians and non-Bosnian Muslims in the Chicago metropolitan area.

Bosnian War (1992–1995)
The war in Bosnia and Herzegovina from 1992 to 1995 brought the largest influx of Bosnians to St Louis, which became the most popular United States destination for Bosnian refugees. It is estimated that 40,000 refugees moved to the St. Louis area in the 1990s and early 2000s, bringing the total St. Louis Bosnian population to some 70,000.
In Chicago, the Bosnian community has largely settled in the northern part of the city, between Lawrence and Howard, from Clark to Lake Michigan. 
Many refugees suffered from post-traumatic stress disorder as a result of gruesome experiences in concentration camps and the death of family and friends. The Illinois Department of Human Services founded the Bosnian Refugee Center in 1994 with the help of public and private agencies to assist the newcomers, and in 1997 it became the nonprofit Bosnian &  American Community Center. Staffed by Bosnian refugees from all backgrounds, the center serves all refugees by providing community services that include educational and family programs, counseling, and cultural activities.

Communities 
The largest Bosnian American communities in the US are found in St. Louis (Bevo Mill's "Little Bosnia"); followed by Chicago, Jacksonville, New York City, Detroit and Houston. Atlanta has Georgia's largest Bosnian American community with over 10,000 in the metro area. An estimated 10,000 Bosnians live in Phoenix, Arizona.

Politics 
The early Bosnian American community were generally inactive in domestic American politics. In the 2010s, Bosnian Americans became more active in politics and activism. In recent local and national elections, Bosnian Americans have mainly backed the Democratic Party due to the party's outreach efforts towards the community, support for Bosnia and Herzegovina, and support for religious and racial diversity. In the 2016 presidential election, the majority of Bosnian Americans expressed support for Hillary Clinton and disapproval of Donald Trump due to his anti-Muslim rhetoric, anti-immigration views, and his popularity with Serbian nationalists.

Issues 
Initially, Bosnian refugees in America faced many issues like adjusting to American life, struggling mental health, and access to quality healthcare. While Bosnian Americans still face significant social issues, the community is considered to be proactive and have positively impacted their local communities via economic contributions, charity, and outreach.

While Muslim Bosnian Americans may not directly encounter Islamophobia due to their European appearance as non-Muslim Americans often associate Islam with darker-skinned people, they are often still negatively affected by anti-Muslim prejudice, especially if they wear a hijab or mention their religious identity.

Organizations
Bosnian-Herzegovinian Film Festival
Bostel
Zambak
Bosnians in Chicago
History of Bosnian Americans in St. Louis

Notable people

See also

 Yugoslav Americans
 European Americans
 Bosnia and Herzegovina–United States relations

References

Further reading
 Hume, Susan E. "Two decades of Bosnian place-making in St. Louis, Missouri." Journal of Cultural Geography 32.1 (2015): 1-22.
 Miller, Olivia. "Bosnian Americans." Gale Encyclopedia of Multicultural America, edited by Thomas Riggs, (3rd ed., vol. 1, Gale, 2014), pp. 331–341. online
 Puskar, Samira. Bosnian Americans of Chicagoland (Arcadia Publishing, 2007).

External links
 St. Louis Bosnian
 BHAAAS

 
America
European-American society
Bosniak diaspora